Nikola Gulan (Serbian Cyrillic: Никола Гулан; born 23 March 1989) is a Serbian professional footballer who plays for Swedish club BK Häcken, as a defender or midfielder.

Gulan was part of the European selection that won the 2007 Meridian Cup in Barcelona. Europe triumphed over Africa, winning 10–1 on aggregate. They won the first leg 6–1 and the second leg 4–0.

Club career
Born in Belgrade, Gulan graduated from FK Partizan's youth system, and made his senior debuts in the 2006–07 campaign, aged only 17. On 4 August 2007, he signed a four-year deal with Italian Serie A side Fiorentina, for a €2.8 million fee.

Gulan was unable to register as a Fiorentina player, as the club had no non-EU registration quota, and then was loaned to fellow league side Sampdoria in January 2008, as a replacement to FC Rostov-bound Ivan Živanović. He subsequently returned to the Viola in June, after only appearing once on the bench in a 1–1 home draw against Cagliari on 22 March.

On 2 February 2009, Gulan joined TSV 1860 Munich on loan until the end of the 2008–09 season. He played his first match for the club on 12 April, starting in a 2–3 away loss against TuS Koblenz for the 2. Bundesliga championship; he appeared in further two matches, as his side finished 12th.

Gulan moved to Empoli in August 2009, also in a temporary deal. He appeared in 25 matches during the season, being also converted as a right back in the process.

Gulan subsequently returned to Fiorentina, and appeared in his first Serie A match on 26 September 2010, coming on as a second half substitute in a 2–0 home win against Parma. He started his first match in the competition on 17 October, in a 1–2 away loss against former side Sampdoria.

In January 2012, Gulan was loaned to Chievo until June. After appearing in only ten minutes, he joined Modena in a season-long loan deal.

After the loan with Modena expired, Gulan rescinded with Fiorentina and returned to his former club FK Partizan, signing a two-year contract on 28 June 2013. He was released by the club in July 2014, and joined RCD Mallorca on 1 September.

References

External links
  
 
 
 

1989 births
Living people
Footballers from Belgrade
Serbian footballers
Association football midfielders
Serbia under-21 international footballers
Footballers at the 2008 Summer Olympics
Olympic footballers of Serbia
FK Partizan players
ACF Fiorentina players
U.C. Sampdoria players
TSV 1860 Munich players
Empoli F.C. players
A.C. ChievoVerona players
Modena F.C. players
RCD Mallorca players
Royal Excel Mouscron players
Hapoel Haifa F.C. players
BK Häcken players
Balzan F.C. players
Serbian SuperLiga players
Serie A players
Serie B players
2. Bundesliga players
Segunda División players
Belgian Pro League players
Israeli Premier League players
Allsvenskan players
Maltese Premier League players
Serbian expatriate footballers
Expatriate footballers in Italy
Expatriate footballers in Germany
Expatriate footballers in Spain
Expatriate footballers in Belgium
Expatriate footballers in Israel
Expatriate footballers in Sweden
Expatriate footballers in Malta
Serbian expatriate sportspeople in Italy
Serbian expatriate sportspeople in Germany
Serbian expatriate sportspeople in Spain
Serbian expatriate sportspeople in Belgium
Serbian expatriate sportspeople in Israel
Serbian expatriate sportspeople in Sweden
Serbian expatriate sportspeople in Malta